This is a list of seasons played by Hibernian F.C. in Scottish and European football since the club first entered the Scottish Cup in 1877. The club was founded by Irish immigrants in 1875 and was admitted into the Scottish Football League in 1893. Hibernian have won the league championship four times, the Scottish Cup three times and the Scottish League Cup three times as well.

The list details the club's achievements in all major competitions, and the top league goalscorer(s) for each season. For some seasons before 1900, the goalscoring information is incomplete but the player mentioned is almost certainly correct. Top scorers in bold were also the top scorers in Hibernian's division that season. Records of local competitions, such as the East of Scotland Shield, are not included.

Seasons

Key

P = Played
W = Games won
D = Games drawn
L = Games lost
F = Goals for
A = Goals against
Pts = Points
Pos = Final position
2 = Scottish Football League Division Two
1 = Scottish Football League Division One
A = Scottish Football League Division A
Premier = Scottish Football League Premier Division
First = Scottish Football League First Division
SPL = Scottish Premier League
SP = Scottish Premiership
SC = Scottish Championship
EC = European Cup

ICFC = Inter-Cities Fairs Cup
ECWC = European Cup Winners' Cup
UC = UEFA Europa League
UEL = UEFA Europa League
ECL = UEFA Europa Conference League
IC = UEFA Intertoto Cup
DNE = Did Not Enter
DNQ = Did Not Qualify
NE = Not Eligible
R1 = Round 1
R2 = Round 2
R3 = Round 3
R4 = Round 4
R5 = Round 5
R6 = Round 6
Quarter = Quarter-finals
Semi = Semi-finals
Final = Runners-up

Colour coding

Notes

References 

Sources

External links
 Scottish Cup Archive
 League Cup Archive
 Scotland – List of Topscorers

Seasons
 
Hibernian
Seasons